Muskeget Island Airport  is a small privately-owned turf landing strip located on Muskeget Island in the town of Nantucket. It is barely maintained and mostly overgrown, and although technically reserved for emergency use only, pilots STOL aircraft will occasionally attempt to land there.

The airport, along with two-thirds of the island, are owned by retired reporter Crocker Snow Jr., whose father built the airstrip.

References

External links

See also 

Airports in Nantucket, Massachusetts
Privately owned airports